Orbe District was a district of the canton of Vaud, Switzerland.

Mergers and name changes
 On 1 January 1970 the former municipalities of Envy and Romainmôtier merged to form the new municipality of Romainmôtier-Envy.  
 On 1 September 2006 the municipalities of L'Abergement, Agiez, Arnex-sur-Orbe, Ballaigues, Baulmes, Bavois, Bofflens, Bretonnières, Chavornay, Les Clées, Corcelles-sur-Chavornay, Croy, Juriens, Lignerolle, Montcherand, Orbe, La Praz, Premier, Rances, Romainmôtier-Envy, Sergey, Valeyres-sous-Rances, Vallorbe, Vaulion and Vuiteboeuf came from the District d'Orbe to join the Jura-North Vaudois District.

Municipalities
Agiez
Arnex-sur-Orbe
Ballaigues
Baulmes
Bavois
Bofflens
Bretonnières
Chavornay
Corcelles-sur-Chavornay
Croy
Juriens
La Praz
L'Abergement
Les Clées
Lignerolle
Montcherand
Orbe
Premier
Rances
Romainmôtier-Envy
Sergey
Valeyres-sous-Rances
Vallorbe
Vaulion
Vuiteboeuf

References

Former districts of the canton of Vaud